Roy Kemp (4 November 1895 – 2 February 1982) was an Australian rules footballer who played with Essendon in the Victorian Football League (VFL).

Notes

External links 

1895 births
1982 deaths
Australian rules footballers from Melbourne
Essendon Football Club players
People from Essendon, Victoria